Crystal Caverns is a  text adventure written by Daniel Kitchen of American studio Imaginative Systems Software for the Apple II and published by Hayden Software in 1982. A Commodore 64 port was released in 1984.

Contents
Crystal Caverns is a treasure-hunt game which takes place in a mansion, as well as in the woods and in tunnels.

Reception
Kelly Grimes reviewed Crystal Caverns in Space Gamer No. 64. Grimes commented that "It is a nice change of pace from hack-and-slash or space shoot-em-ups, but it is not worth the price." In Softalk, Roe Adams commented that the game is "written primarily for intermediate level adventurers" and concluded that it "offers several hours of enjoyable fun and thought." In The Book of Adventure Games, Kim Schuette commented on the "imagininatively written, highly descriptive text, and several very well done puzzles", concluding that the game was "all in all, rather interesting."

References

External links
 
 1984 Software Encyclopedia from Electronic Games
 
Review in Core magazine

1980s interactive fiction
1982 video games
Apple II games
Commodore 64 games
Video games developed in the United States